Falcón Municipality may refer to the following municipalities in Venezuela:

Falcón Municipality, Cojedes
Falcón Municipality, Falcón

Municipality name disambiguation pages